Too Much Texas were an English indie rock band, formed in 1984 in Manchester, best known as the band that Tom Hingley was in before joining Inspiral Carpets.

History
The band formed in 1984 in Manchester, by singer Tom Hingley, who was studying English, along with fellow Abingdon natives Gordon MacKay and Raymond Breckon, all of whom worked part-time at The Haçienda nightclub as glass collectors. After a split flexi disc released with Debris magazine, they released their debut single proper, "Hurry on Down", on Ugly Man Records in 1988, and supported New Order, The House of Love and The Beloved.

Hingley joined Inspiral Carpets in 1989 and now fronts Tom Hingley and the Lovers. The band continued with a new singer, releasing the Smart EP in 1989, eventually splitting in 1992.

A retrospective collection, Juvenilia, was released in 2006 on Hingley's Newmemorabilia label, and the band re-formed for a UK tour.

Band members
Tom Hingley – vocals, guitar
Raymond Breckon – bass
Gordon MacKay – lead guitar
Laurence Ash – drums
Tim Ainsworth - drums
Guy Ainsworth - drums vocals

Discography
 "Fixed Link" (1986) – flexi disk, split with Soil
 "Hurry On Down" (1988), Ugly Man – 12" single
 Smart EP (1989), Playtime
 Juvenilia (2006), Newmemorabilia – CD

References

External links
Too Much Texas at MySpace

English indie rock groups
Musical groups from Manchester